Rational Dynamic Object Oriented Requirements System (DOORS) (formerly Telelogic DOORS) is a requirement management tool. It is a client–server application, with a Windows-only client and servers for Linux, Windows, and Solaris. There is also a web client, DOORS Web Access.

Rational DOORS has its own programming language called DOORS eXtension Language (DXL).

Rational DOORS Next Generation is now developed on the IBM Jazz platform. The Jazz platform uses Open Services for Lifecycle Collaboration (OSLC).

In order to complete its functionality, Rational DOORS has an open architecture that supports third-party plugins.

DOORS was originally published by Quality Systems and Software Ltd (QSS) in 1991.
Telelogic acquired QSS in mid-2000 and IBM acquired Telelogic in 2008.

History 

DOORS was created by Dr Richard Stevens, a researcher through the 1970's and 1980's at the European Space Agency's Research Institute (ESRIN). The first version was provided to the UK Ministry of Defence in 1991-2. The first commercial version was released in 1993.

Features 
DOORS is designed to ease the requirements management process with a variety of features:

 The requirements database can be accessed with a web browser through Rational DOORS Web Access.
 Changes to requirements can be managed with either a simple predefined change proposal system or a more thorough, customizable change control workflow through integration to Rational change management solutions.
 With the Requirements Interchange Format, suppliers and development partners can be directly involved in the development process.
 Requirements to design items, test plans, test cases, and other requirements can be linked for easy and powerful traceability.
 Business users, marketing, suppliers, systems engineers, and business analysts can collaborate directly through requirements discussions.
 Testers can link requirements to test cases using the Test Tracking Toolkit for manual test environments.
 Open Services for Lifecycle Collaboration (OSLC) can be used for specifications for requirements management, change management, and quality management to integrate with systems and software lifecycle tools.
 Can be integrated with other Rational tools, including Rational Team Concert, RationalQuality Manager, Rational DOORS Next Generation, Rational Rhapsody®, Jazz™ Reporting Service, and Rational System Architect, and also many third-party tools, providing a comprehensive traceability solution.

See also 

 DOORS Next (Generation) - also known as Jazz
 IBM's Rational Rhapsody
 List of requirements engineering tools
 Open Services for Lifecycle Collaboration

References

DOORS
Software requirements